Beyhan Sultan ("leader of Kings", died 1559), also known as Peykhan Sultan, was an Ottoman princess, daughter of Selim I and probably Ayşe Hafsa Sultan. She was the sister of Sultan Suleiman the Magnificent.

Marriage
In 1513, Beyhan Sultan married vizier Damat Ferhat Pasha. However, on 1 November 1524, Ferhet Pasha quelled the rebellion of Janberdi and was executed on the orders of her brother Suleiman the Magnificent.

She was alienated from her brother and refused to remarry and lived in a self exile from Istanbul in her palace at Skopje.

Beyhan Sultan's loyalty to her husband surpassed her loyalty to her family, which was a rare occasion. 
Ferhat was executed on the grounds of rapacious and ruthless conduct in the provinces  which he was assigned. 
Through the intercession of  Suleiman's mother Ayşe Hafsa Sultan, Ferhat had been pardoned after his first offences, but he continued to provoke the complaints from his constituents, the sultan ordered him executed.
After 1524, she was remarried to Mehmed Pasha, with whom she had a daughter, Esmehan Hanımsultan (sometimes she is indicated as daughter of Ferhad).

Issue
The number and paternity of Beyhan's children is debated: Beyhan's only certain daughter was Esmehan (or Ismihan) Hanımsultan, but it is uncertain whether she was the daughter of the first or second marriage. Additionally, documents relating to Ferhad Pasha's execution mention his and Beyhan's children when they talk about his family's grief, but without specifying their name, number or gender.

The question therefore remains disputed.

Death and burial
Beyhan Sultan died in her palace a Skopje in 1559. Her resting place is located inside the türbe of her father Selim I in Yavuz Selim Mosque.

Depictions in literature and popular culture
In the TV series Muhteşem Yüzyıl, Beyhan Sultan is portrayed by Turkish actress Pınar Çağlar Gençtürk.

References

Sources
 

16th-century Ottoman princesses
1559 deaths
1497 births